Flamstead is a village and civil parish in north-west Hertfordshire, England, close to the junction of the A5 and the M1 motorway at junction 9. The name is thought by some historians to be a corruption of the original Verulamstead.

Flamstead stands on a ridge above the River Ver, which runs on its north side; to the south the village extends downhill to the adjoining hamlet of Trowley Bottom. The first documented record of the village was in 1006, and it was also recorded in the Domesday Book eighty years later. In the Middle Ages it was important enough for a market and fair to be held there, though it is now mainly a dormitory village for neighbouring towns, several of which can be reached by bus from the village. The current population is around 1,306.

Buildings

From a distance the village is dominated by the parish church of St Leonard, with its characteristic "Hertfordshire spike" spire. St Leonard's (Church of England) is believed to stand on the site of a ninth-century Saxon chapel, though the oldest parts of the present structure date from around 1140. Features of interest include medieval wall paintings, the Saunders Memorial of 1670, and a fine fifteenth-century rood screen. The village also has a Methodist church.

Other notable buildings in Flamstead include the almshouses in the High Street, built in 1669; the Three Blackbirds pub opposite (one of three in the village), partly dating from the sixteenth century; and several attractive cottages of similar age. Flamstead has 65 listed buildings.

Flamstead has a pre-school and a primary school, though older local children have to travel to secondary schools elsewhere in Hertfordshire. The present school dates from the late 1950s, and the previous school building adjacent to the churchyard is now used by the pre-school and also as the Village Hall.

Beechwood Park School, now a preparatory school, was once the site of a Benedictine nunnery and then a Tudor mansion. It lies in the parish, though it is closer to the neighbouring village of Markyate. Beechwood Park gave its name to a song by the Zombies, written by the group's bassist Chris White, who grew up in Markyate.

History
The Old Watling Street in the parish, as its name suggests, follows the route of the original Roman road. The modern A5 runs roughly parallel with it but closer to the River Ver.

In 2008 Channel 4's Time Team discovered a previously unknown major Roman temple complex, near Watling Street at nearby Friar's Wash which was likely associated with Verulamium (St. Albans). An earlier building, purpose unknown, was built on the site during the reign of Emperor Trajan, based on a coin found at the site dating to 98 AD, and the temple complex began construction during the 3rd century and existed until at least . The programme about the dig was first broadcast on 4 January 2009.

The village of Flamstead was built away from the site of the Roman temple complex during the Saxon era, and it is first documented in 1006, although the village was likely present during the 9th century. St Leonard's Church was built on the site of a 9th-century chapel, while the present building was built during the Norman era, in 1140. Much of the present buildings in Flamstead date to the 15th-17th centuries, with the almshouses dating to 1669, many cottages dating to a similar age to the almshouses (late 17th century) and many paintings in the church dating to the 15th to 17th centuries.

Since 2002, an annual Scarecrow Festival has been held in Flamstead to raise funds for the upkeep of the church and for local charities.

Since 2014 the village has held a literary festival, 'Books in the Belfry', attracting best-selling authors including Tony Parsons, Sophie Hannah, Jane Hawking, Jonathan Stroud, Alex Scarrow, Clare Mulley, Ian Ridley and Michael Calvin. Proceeds go to restoration of medieval wall-paintings in the village church.

References

External links 

The village website, with links to other sites of interest
The parish council's website
GENUKI(tm) page
Flamstead (A Guide to Old Hertfordshire)

 
Villages in Hertfordshire
Dacorum
Civil parishes in Hertfordshire